Suraj Gowda (born 13 April 1988) is an actor in the Kannada film industry who made his big commercial debut in Maduveya Mamatheya Kareyole under Thoogudeepa productions which bagged the biggest opening collection for a debutant in 2016. Suraj was nominated for the best actor category in SIIMA and IIFA Awards for his role in the movie Siliconn City (2017). Lakshmi Thanaya and Ninna Sanihake are his upcoming films.

Suraj is also making a much awaited debut as a director and writer with the Kannada romantic comedy Ninna Sanihake.

Early life and career
Born to M A Prakash and Surekha V in Mysore Karnataka India, Suraj Gowda is a model-turned actor who started his career in the film industry after winning Zee Kannada's reality show Paradeshadalli Paradata in 2011. This multi-talented prodigy is also the winner of Mr. Mysore and Mr. Karnataka titles in 2009 and 2013 respectively. Suraj debuted his film career with the art film Yenanthiya and with Ninna Sanihake, he is foraying into script writing and direction.

Filmography

Reality Show and Contest

References

21st-century Indian male actors
Indian male film actors
Indian male models
Living people
Participants in Indian reality television series
Male actors from Mysore
Reality show winners
1988 births